IT Examiner was an information technology news website based in Bangalore, India.

The publication was established in 2008 by journalist Mike Magee, who had previously established The Register and The Inquirer. It was financially backed by Chinese company Metaplume, with the aim of capitalising on the growth of India's burgeoning IT industry.

In 2009, Metaplume terminated all the staff and the site was shut down.

References

External links
IT Examiner website

2008 establishments in Karnataka
2009 disestablishments in India
Defunct computer magazines
Defunct magazines published in India
Computer magazines published in India
Online magazines published in India
Magazines established in 2008
Magazines disestablished in 2009
Mass media in Bangalore
Technology websites